Helena Frisk (born 1965) is a Swedish politician of the Social Democratic Party. She was a member of the Riksdag from 1994 to 2006. Frisk has been a substitute member of the Riksdag since 2006, replacing Matilda Ernkrans.

External links 
Helena Frisk at the Riksdag website

Members of the Riksdag from the Social Democrats
Living people
1965 births
Women members of the Riksdag
Members of the Riksdag 2002–2006
21st-century Swedish women politicians